What Christmas Means is the fourth studio album by American singer Kem. It was released by Motown Records on October 16, 2012 in the United States. His first Christmas album, the album features traditional Christmas songs, along with original material. Guests on the album features Ledisi and the Detroit Gospel Choir. What Christmas Means peaked at number 64 on the US Billboard 200 and number six on the US Top Holiday Albums. A deluxe edition with four additional bonus tracks was issued on October 29, 2013.

Critical reception

Andy Kellman, writing for Allmusic, wrote that "Kem followers probably know to approach What Christmas Means without the expectation of hearing a thunderous version of "Little Drummer Boy" or collaborations with the Trans-Siberian Orchestra. Sure enough, the singer and songwriter's first Christmas album is filled with the same relaxed, romantic, spiritual, and gently uplifting moods of his studio albums. He didn't make this on autopilot, either [...] Kem fans who celebrate Christmas will likely value this disc as a seasonal staple for years to come."

Track listing

Sample credits
"Be Mine for Christmas" contains elements of "Me and Mrs. Jones" (1972) as performed by Billy Paul.

Charts

Weekly charts

Year-end charts

Release history

References

Kem (singer) albums
2012 Christmas albums
Christmas albums by American artists
Motown albums
Contemporary R&B Christmas albums
Gospel Christmas albums